China Zhongwang Holdings Limited is the second largest industrial aluminium extrusion product developer and manufacturer in the world and the largest in Asia and China. The company is headquartered in Liaoyang, China.

Principal Businesses 
China Zhongwang is principally engaged in the production of high precision, large-section and high value-added industrial aluminium extrusion products which are used in transportation (including railway passenger compartments and cargo carriages, metropolitan subway and light rail, automobiles, heavy trucks, vessels, aviation and aerospace) machinery and equipment and electric power engineering sectors. The company focuses on three core synergistic businesses; industrial aluminum extrusion, deep processing and aluminum flat rolling. The three core businesses operate together on the basis of upstream and downstream resource-sharing.

History and Scale 
China Zhongwang was founded in 1993. It now owns and operates over 90 aluminum extrusion production lines (including 21 production lines with large extrusion presses of 75MN or above). It has an annual production capacity of over 1.2 million tons.  It was certified by the Chinese government as a “State Accredited Enterprise Technology Centre,” a “State CNAS Laboratory,”  Liaoning Engineering and Technology Research Centre, and Liaoning Post-Doctoral Research Centre.

In 2011, China Zhongwang expanded into the business of advanced processing and fabrication of aluminium products and has since then developed a range of fabricated products, such as industrial aluminum pallets, aluminum high-speed train carriages for alpine regions, aluminum chassis for buses, as well as aluminum bodies and parts for passenger cars.

Since 2011, China Zhongwang started developing its flat rolling project. The flat rolling production base is in Tianjin, with an annual production capacity of 3 million tonnes.

Recent Developments 
In October 2011, China Zhongwang announced several major transactions related to the development of the synergistic aluminum flat rolled product business. It started the development of the project according to plan, and entered into a total of six equipment purchase agreements with three independent third party suppliers through two wholly owned subsidiaries. According to the agreements, China Zhongwang will invest approximately US$3.8 billion (about HKD29.5 billion) in total. The payment will be made in four installments between 2011 and 2014. The purchase consists of hot and cold continuous rolling mills for the production of medium-to-high thickness plate and sheet products; smelting and casting lines; quenching furnaces and heat treatment furnaces. They will also include the ancillary production of medium-to-high thickness plate and sheet products, and aluminum foil rolling mills, among others.

As of Aug 30th 2021, Zhongwang Holdings Stock has been suspended from trade. This is due to the indictment brought by the United States alleging Zhongwang's "defrauded the United States out of $1.8 billion in tariffs due on Chinese imports."

Founder and Management  
Liu Zhongtian is the Founder of China Zhongwang Holdings.

Before founding China Zhongwang in 1993, Liu Zhongtian established and served as the chairman of Liaoyang Factory, Futian Chemical and Liaoning Chengcheng Plastics.  He has been the Chairman of China Zhongwang Holdings Limited since August 1, 2008 and has been its executive director since January 29, 2008. Mr. Liu received a Diploma in Administrative Management from Liaoning Radio and TV University, China in 2002. According to Forbes, in 2016 he and his family were worth $3.2 billion.

Liu Zhongtian stepped down as president on 22 March 2016 but remains as chairman. On the same day, Mr. Lu Changqing was appointed as the president.

On 27 November 2017, Mr. Liu resigned from the position of executive director, chairman of the board, Member of the Nomination and Remuneration Committee of the Company and Chairman of the Strategy and Development Committee of the Company due to his personal health reasons.  On the same day, Mr. Lu Changqing was appointed as chairman of the board.  

Lu Changqing is executive director, the chairman and President of the Company . He is primarily responsible for the company's strategic planning, operation and management.

Listing 
China Zhongwang was listed on the Hong Kong Stock Exchange in May 2009 with an IPO price of HK$7.0 per share. It was the world's largest IPO in that year and raised a capital of US$1.26 billion. The IPO was handled by Citic Securities, J.P. Morgan and UBS.

Overseas Operations 
China Zhongwang exports its extruded products to over a dozen countries, including the United States, Germany, Belgium, the Netherlands, the United Kingdom, Japan and others.

References

External links

Aluminium companies of China
Metal companies of China
Manufacturing companies of China
Companies based in Liaoning
Manufacturing companies established in 1993
Chinese companies established in 1993
Privately held companies of China
Companies listed on the Hong Kong Stock Exchange
Chinese brands
2009 initial public offerings
1993 establishments in China